Below are the squads for the 2006 VIVA World Cup tournament in Occitania.

Round

Monaco

Head coach: Thierry Petit

Occitania

Head coach: Nadeva Robinson

Sápmi

Head coach: Ivar Morten Normark

Southern Cameroons

External links
Official forum

Viva World Cup squads